William Bruce Dickey (February 13, 1842 – November 2, 1902) was an American businessman and politician.

Dickey was born in Smithfield, Madison County, New York. He moved to Minnesota in 1859 and settled in Zumbrota, Goodhue County, Minnesota with his wife and family. Dickey was involved with the mercantile business. Dickey served in the 8th Minnesota Infantry Regiment during the American Civil War and was commissioned a first lieutenant. Dickey served in the Minnesota Senate from 1899 until his death in 1902. He died in Thief River Falls, Minnesota.

References

1842 births
1902 deaths
People from Smithfield, New York
People from Zumbrota, Minnesota
People of Minnesota in the American Civil War
Businesspeople from Minnesota
Republican Party Minnesota state senators